Owlshead Peak is a peak 1.5 nautical miles (2.8 km) east of Cape Bellue on Stresher Peninsula on the west coast of Graham Land. Photographed by the Falkland Islands and Dependencies Aerial Survey Expedition (FIDASE) in 1956–57, and roughly surveyed by the Falkland Islands Dependencies Survey FIDS from "Detaille Island", 1956-59. The name is descriptive of the feature when seen from Crystal Sound and Darbel Bay.

External links 

 Owlshead Peak on USGS website
 Owlshead Peak on AADC website
 Owlshead Peak on SCAR website
 distance calculator between Owlshead Peak and nearby sites
 current up to date weather at Owlshead Peak

References 

Mountains of Graham Land
Loubet Coast